subatomicglue (written uncapitalized, as a single word) is an internet musical group formed in 1999, the brain child of Kevin Meinert. They are part of the free music movement, and are among the first bands to use Creative Commons licensing. The band openly encourages collaboration and use of their music in other projects.

Collaborators include Bob Rissetto, James Hindley, Herb Sawyer, Lewis Hill, Vavrek (of ), Basilisk, and Tony Nagy. subatomicglue is known for free instrumental electronic music that crosses several genres: including electronic rock, trance, industrial, IDM.

Their front page states that subatomicglue is "groovy, dark, exotic, with elements of beauty and shadow.  an exploration to the reality of your innerworld." In the spirit of open source and Creative Commons, subatomicglue accepts requests for collaboration, submissions of song art, and cover art, and remixes of songs. subatomicglue has collaborated with several Internet projects. Song source material is available for remixers and artists.

Albums 

Albums are freely available in mp3 and ogg format at the band's website www.subatomicglue.com, along with a frequently updated work in progress that anyone may listen to. The music can be found on P2P networks, such as eMule/eDonkey, Gnutella, or Slsk.

subatomicglue´s first successful album "globalenemy" debuted in 2001, with a limited supply of CDs for sale. The CD came with a four-page booklet in a jewel-case with much full-color art. Later CDs by subatomicglue are simpler and of the promotional CD-envelope style. CDs can be purchased or downloaded from the band's website, or from several mirrors or internet music mp3 websites.

The band's most recent album is titled "Selling your friend (for cash)" and was officially released on in late 2006.

Video games 
In 2003, subatomicglue collaborated with the video game company Isotope 244 to create music for the game Atomic Cannon.

In 2005, subatomicglue created the soundtrack for Isotope244´s Atomic Battle Dragons game that appeared on PC and pocket PC.

Meinert has roots and apparently a day job in the video game industry.

Other projects 
In 2005, subatomicglue´s music appeared on Upscale Chicago, a local Chicago show that highlights nightlife, upscale dining, and high society around the Chicago area.

subatomicglue also builds synthesizers, including the x0xb0x (a TB303 clone), the MidiboxSID, and the 9090 drum machine. subatomicglue was covered in synthtopia about the x0xb0x they built.

References

External links 
 www.subatomicglue.com (official homepage)
 http://music.download.com/subatomicglue
 http://www.audiostreet.net/artists/001/422/subatomicglue.html
 http://zebox.com/subatomicglue/
 http://subatomicglue.iuma.com/
 http://www.garageband.com/subatomicglue
 http://www.synthtopia.com/news/06_01/x0xb0x_blow_by_blow.html
 http://www.subatomicglue.com/blog/
 http://www.vavrek.com
 http://www.allofaudio.de/artist_item+M50fcfd3c266.html

Musical groups established in 1999
Electronic music groups